"Ye" is a song by Nigerian singer Burna Boy. It was released on August 6, 2018, as the sixth single from his third studio album Outside (2018). The song was produced by Nigerian record producer Phantom. It peaked at number 26 and 31 on Billboards Mainstream R&B/Hip-Hop and R&B/Hip-Hop Airplay charts, respectively. "Ye" won Song of the Year and Listener's Choice at the 2019 Soundcity MVP Awards Festival. It also won Song of the Year and was nominated for Best Pop Single and Best Recording of the Year at The Headies 2019.

In August 2019, Rolling Stone reported that "Ye" earned around 11 million streams over seven months across major U.S. streaming platforms.

Background and reception
Nigerian record producer Phantom created the beat in less than two hours, combining a kick, piano synths and a few snares. His vocals were layered on the beat. "Ye" saw a 200 percent spike in its streaming numbers after searches for Kanye West's album Ye unintentionally caused listeners to stumbled upon it. Burna Boy thanked Kanye West for the confusion on Twitter. In an email to The Fader magazine, Burna Boy said the video "essentially shows the unrelenting nature of Nigerians". A writer for Native magazine said "Ye" is being viewed as a new anthem because it "embraces the anathema of every self-interest seeking seemingly good-natured Nigerian." As of December 2020, Ye is the most certified solo single by a Nigerian artiste.

Covers
Jamaican singer Koffee performed her rendition of "Ye" during her first ever London show. A few days later, she also performed her rendition on BBC Radio 1Xtra Live Lounge.

Accolades

Charts

Weekly charts

Year-end charts

Certifications

References

2018 singles
2018 songs
Burna Boy songs
Songs written by Burna Boy